Plunge for distance was an underwater diving event held as part of the diving at the 1904 Summer Olympics programme. The competition was held on Monday, September 5, 1904. It was the first time diving events were held at the Olympics.  Five divers competed.

Plunge for distance was a diving long jump.  Competitors dove into the pool from a standing position and their attained distance was measured after either 60 seconds passed or their head broke the surface, whichever came first. Plunge for distance did not appear in any subsequent Olympic Games.

Results

See also
History of swimming

References
 
International Olympic Committee Sports - Swimming

P